Kalle Kerman (born February 10, 1979, in Kuopio) is Finnish professional ice hockey forward. He is currently an unrestricted free agent who most recently played with KalPa in the Finnish Liiga.

Kerman first played with KalPa in his junior years and men's lower levels before making his SM-liiga debut with SaiPa during 2002–03 season. He played in SaiPa for three seasons before moving to Sweden.

In Sweden he played one season in Mora IK and one full season in Luleå HF before moving back to Finland during second season in Luleå. He played rest of 2007–08 in Jokerit and continued there next season. For 2009–10 season he is returning to KalPa.

On January 26, 2011, Kerman agreed to a three-year contract extension with KalPa.

In 2009 he performed well in national team exhibition games and was chosen to represent Finland in World Championships.

References

External links 

1979 births
Living people
Finnish ice hockey left wingers
KalPa players
SaiPa players
Jokerit players
Mora IK players
Luleå HF players
People from Kuopio
Sportspeople from North Savo